Yi Bangja (4 November 1901 – 30 April 1989) was the wife of Yi Un, the last Crown Prince of Korea.

Birth
Born Princess Masako of Nashimoto, she was the first daughter of Japanese imperial family member Prince Nashimoto Morimasa, the seventh son of Prince Kuni Asahiko and his wife, Princess Itsuko, a daughter of Marquis Naohiro Nabeshima. She was a first cousin of Empress Kōjun of Japan. On maternal side, she was also a first cousin of Princess Setsuko.

Marriage
Princess Masako was a leading candidate to wed the crown prince of Japan, the future Emperor Hirohito. Other candidates included Princess Nagako of Kuni (who became the future Empress Kōjun), and Tokiko Ichijō, a daughter of Prince Ichijō Saneteru. The possibility of infertility and the feeble political influence of her family were among the reasons she was removed from the list of candidates. However, Princess Masako was selected instead to wed Crown Prince Euimin of Korea who had been held by Japanese government under the pretense of studying abroad in 1917. The wedding was held on 28 April 1920, at the Korean royal residence in Tokyo. Princess Masako was still a student at the Girls' Department of the Gakushūin Peers' School at the time; her new title became Her Royal Highness Crown Princess of King Yi. In addition, the title she received from birth, Princess Masako, still retained after she married. Despite an unfavorable fertility diagnosis prior to her marriage, she gave birth to a son, Prince Jin, on 18 August 1921. However, Prince Jin died under suspicious circumstances when she visited Korea with her husband on 11 May 1922.

On 24 April 1926, Princess Masako received the formal title Her Royal Highness Princess Masako, Queen Yi when the Emperor Sunjong, the elder brother of Crown Prince Euimin, died. Under the terms of the Japan–Korea Annexation Treaty, the Korean royal title was demoted from that of "Emperor" to "King" and Crown Prince Euimin was never formally crowned as the monarch of Korea; therefore, Princess Masako would later be addressed as "Bangja, Crown Princess Euimin" in Korea. On 29 December 1931, she gave birth to a second son, Yi Ku.

Life as last Crown Princess of Korea
After the end of World War II, all former royal and peerage titles were abolished by the American occupation authorities; ever since, Princess Masako took the Korean name Yi Bangja. Republic of Korea President Rhee Syng-man's fear of Crown Prince Euimin's popularity prevented the family's homecoming, and they lived in destitution as Korean residents in Japan. In November 1963, Yi Bangja and her family came back to Korea at the invitation of President Park Chung-hee and were allowed to live in Changdeok Palace in downtown Seoul. However, by this time, Crown Prince Euimin was already unconscious from cerebral thrombosis and was rushed to Seoul Sungmo Hospital where he remained bedridden for the rest of his life.

Thereafter, Yi Bangja devoted herself to the education of mentally and physically disabled people. She successively became the chairman of various committees including the Commemorative Committee of Crown Prince Euimin, and the Myeonghwi-won, an asylum for deaf-and-dumb persons or patients suffering from infantile paralysis and she founded the Jahye School and the Myeonghye School, which helps disabled people become socially adapted. She was adored as the "mother of the handicapped in Korea" and despite lingering anti-Japanese sentiment in Korea she was a widely respected Japanese woman in Korea.

Some members of the Nashimoto family, her relatives, visited Seoul in October 2008 to pay their respects. The Nashimotos have continued supporting her charity foundations for helping Korean physically challenged people even after the Princess died in 1989.

Death
Yi Bangja died on 30 April 1989, aged 87, at the Nakseon Hall, Changdeok Palace from cancer. Her funeral was held as a semi-state funeral which Prince Mikasa and Princess Mikasa of Japan attended and she was buried beside her husband, Crown Prince Euimin, at the Hongyureung, Namyangju near Seoul.

Other
She wrote an autobiography, The World is One: Princess Yi Bangja's Autobiography.

Children
 Prince Yi Jin (18 August 1921 – 11 May 1922). He was poisoned during a visit to Korea with his parents. His funeral was held on 17 May 1922 and he was buried in Korea.
 Prince  Yi Gu  (29 December 1931 – 16 July 2005). Prince Gu became the 29th Head of the Korean Imperial Household upon the death of his father.

Ancestry

Popular culture
Yi Bangja was portrayed by Naho Toda in the 2016 film The Last Princess.

See also
Rulers of Korea
Korea under Japanese rule

References

1901 births
1989 deaths
Japanese princesses
Nashimoto-no-miya
House of Yi
Korea under Japanese rule
Japan–Korea relations
South Korean people of Japanese descent
Grand Cordons of the Order of the Precious Crown
People from Tokyo